Nicola Deaton is a female former international table tennis player from England.

Table tennis career
She represented England at three successive World Table Tennis Championships, from 1993 until 1997, in the Corbillon Cup (women's team event).

She won 16 English National Table Tennis Championships including five singles titles. Deaton reached the ranking of England number one.

Personal life
She married fellow English international Alex Perry.

See also
 List of England players at the World Team Table Tennis Championships

References

English female table tennis players
Living people
1976 births